Almost Never is a British musical drama series that premiered on CBBC on 15 January 2019. The series details the experiences of two fictional bands; The Wonderland and Girls Here First. Almost Never stars Nathaniel Dass, Harry Still, Oakley Orchard, Mya-Lecia Naylor, Miriam Nyarko, Lola Moxom, Lilly Stanion, Kimberly Wyatt, Tillie Amartey, Tyra Richardson and Aston Merrygold.

Series overview

Episodes

Series 1 (2019)

Series 2 (2019)

Series 3 (2021)

References

Almost Never